Alexander Laird (born 21 October 1901) was a Scottish footballer who played in the Football League for Preston North End.

References

1901 births
Year of death missing
English footballers
Association football forwards
English Football League players
Rangers F.C. players
Preston North End F.C. players
Armadale F.C. players
Falkirk F.C. players